The Colonel Micah Whitmarsh House is an historic house in East Greenwich, Rhode Island. The -story Greek Revival style brick house was built c. 1767-1771 by John Reynolds, and acquired in 1773 by Micah Whitmarsh, a founding member of the local Kentish Guards militia, which are located nearby in the Armory of the Kentish Guards. It is distinctive as the only brick house on Main Street. It has been owned since 1966 by the East Greenwich Historical Society.

The house was listed on the National Register of Historic Places in 1971.

See also
National Register of Historic Places listings in Kent County, Rhode Island

References

Houses completed in 1767
Houses on the National Register of Historic Places in Rhode Island
Houses in Kent County, Rhode Island
Buildings and structures in East Greenwich, Rhode Island
1767 establishments in Rhode Island
National Register of Historic Places in Kent County, Rhode Island
Historic district contributing properties in Rhode Island
Greek Revival houses in Rhode Island